Christophe Soumillon (born 4 June 1981) is a Belgian jockey based in France.

Career
Coming from a racing background, Soumillon is the son of jump jockey Jean-Marc Soumillon. He rode in pony races and left Belgium aged fifteen to go to the racing school in Chantilly, France, where he was then apprenticed to trainer Cédric Boutin.

Soumillon rode his first Group race winner aged eighteen when Berine's Son, trained by André Fabre, won the 2000 Prix de Fontainebleau. The following season he won four Group 1 races, including the Prix du Jockey Club on Anabaa.

Soumillon won the cravache d'or (the golden whip or French champion jockey title) for the first time in 2003 and won his tenth title in 2018.

Although primarily known as a flat jockey, Soumillon has also ridden over hurdles, winning the 2010 Grande Course de Haies d'Auteuil (French Champion Hurdle) on Mandali.

2022 riding suspension
On 30 September 2022 Soumillon was given a 60 day ban for elbowing Rossa Ryan off his horse during the Prix Thomas Bryon at Saint-Cloud. The ban was set to start on 14 October, allowing him to ride in the Prix de l'Arc de Triomphe on 2 October. On 4 October the racing operation owned by the Aga Khan, citing the elbowing incident, immediately terminated Soumillon's contract as their retainer jockey in France. Soumillon, who will still be permitted to ride the Aga Khan's horses on occasion, later told the Racing Post that he had bridges to rebuild and was determined to show commitment to those that wished to engage his services.

In November 2022 it was revealed that the Gaming unit of the Central Directorate of the Judicial Police, which oversees racing and gambling in France, had requested that Soumillon's suspension be extended to six months, or that his license be withdrawn indefinitely. In their request, the police said that Soumillon's behavior was "voluntary and dangerous," and "a serious risk to the public order within horse racing." Soumillon has been given time to respond, after which the French Ministry of the Interior will make a decision on the Directorate's request.

Personal life 
Soumillon married TV presenter and former beauty queen Sophie Thalmann on 22 July 2006. The couple have three children, daughter Charlie (born September 2005), son Mika (born November 2008) and son Robin (born April 2017).

Major wins 
 France
 Critérium International - (4) - Dalakhani (2002), Carlotamix (2005), Thunder Snow (2016), Royal Meeting (2018)
 Critérium de Saint-Cloud - (2) - Linda's Lad (2005), Prince Gibraltar (2013)
 Grande Course de Haies d'Auteuil - (1) - Mandali (2010)
 Grand Prix de Paris - (4) - Khalkevi (2002), Rail Link (2006), Montmartre (2008), Shakeel (2017)
 Grand Prix de Saint-Cloud - (2) - Mirio (2001), Zarak (2017)
 Poule d'Essai des Poulains - (3) - Vahorimix (2001), Clodovil (2003), Silver Frost (2009)
 Poule d'Essai des Pouliches - (5) - Musical Chimes (2003), Darjina (2007), Zarkava (2008), Beauty Parlour (2012), Ervedya (2015)
 Prix Cambacérès - (1) - Hippomene (2013)
 Prix de l'Arc de Triomphe - (2) - Dalakhani (2003), Zarkava (2008)
 Prix d'Astarté - (2) - Turtle Bow (2002), Mandesha (2006)
 Prix du Cadran - (3) - Reefscape (2005), Bannaby (2008), Vazirabad (2017)
 Prix de Diane - (2) - Latice (2004), Zarkava (2008)
 Prix de la Forêt - (1) - Paco Boy (2008)
 Prix Ganay - (5) - Dylan Thomas (2007), Planteur (2011), Cirrus des Aigles (2014, 2015), Dariyan (2016)
 Prix d'Ispahan - (2) - Valixir (2005), Cirrus des Aigles (2014)
 Prix Jacques Le Marois - (3) - Whipper (2004), Makfi (2010), Excelebration (2012)
 Prix Jean Prat - (1) - Thunder Snow (2017)
 Prix Jean Romanet - (1) - Stacelita (2010)
 Prix du Jockey Club - (4) - Anabaa Blue (2001), Dalakhani (2003), Darsi (2006), Vadeni (2022)
 Prix Lupin - (1) - Dalakhani (2003)
 Prix Marcel Boussac - (2) - Zarkava (2007), Rosanara (2009)
 Prix Maurice de Gheest - (2) - Porlezza (2003), Whipper (2005)
 Prix Morny - (2) - Dutch Art (2006), Perfect Power (2021)
 Prix du Moulin de Longchamp - (2) - Darjina (2007), Ervedya (2015)
 Prix de l'Opéra - (4) - Terre à Terre (2001), Mandesha (2006), Dalkala (2013), Tarnawa (2020)
 Prix Royal-Oak - (2) - Vazirabad (2015, 2016)
 Prix Saint-Alary - (3) - Vadawina (2005), Vazira (2014), Incarville (2021)
 Prix Vermeille - (5) - Pearly Shells (2002), Shawanda (2005), Mandesha (2006), Zarkava (2008), Tarnawa (2020)

 Canada
  Canadian International - (1) - Sarah Lynx (2011)
 E.P. Taylor Stakes - (1) Reggane (2010)

 Germany
 Deutsches Derby - (1) - Sea The Moon (2014)

 Great Britain
 Champion Stakes - (1) - Cirrus des Aigles (2011), Almanzor (2016)
 Commonwealth Cup - (1) - Perfect Power (2022)
 Coronation Cup - (2) - Shirocco (2006), Cirrus de Aigles (2014)
 Coronation Stakes - (1) - Ervedya (2015)
 Eclipse Stakes - (1) - Vadeni (2022)
 Falmouth Stakes - (1) - Giofra (2012)
 King George VI and Queen Elizabeth Stakes - (1) - Hurricane Run (2006)
 Queen Anne Stakes - (1) - Valixir (2005)
 Racing Post Trophy - (1) - American Post (2003)
 Sun Chariot Stakes - (1) - Sahpresa (2010)
 Middle Park Stakes - (1) - Perfect Power (2021)

 Hong Kong
 Chairman's Sprint Prize - (2) - Billet Express (2006), Gold Fun (2015)
 Hong Kong Classic Mile - (2) - Thumbs Up (2009), Beauty Flash (2010)
 Hong Kong Derby - (1) - Viva Pataca (2006)
 Hong Kong Gold Cup - (1) - Perfect Partner (2005)
 Hong Kong Mile - (2) - Good Ba Ba (2008), Admire Mars (2019)
 Queen's Silver Jubilee Cup - (1) - Joyful Winner (2006)
 Stewards' Cup - (3) - Bullish Luck (2005), Good Ba Ba (2009), Giant Treasure (2016)

 Hungary
 OTP Hungária Grand Prix - (1) - Overdose (2009)

 Ireland
 Irish Champion Stakes - (1) - Almanzor (2016)
 Irish Oaks - (1) - Shawanda (2005)
 Pretty Polly Stakes - (1) - Hanami (2003)

 Italy
 Gran Premio di Milano - (1) - Shamdala (2006)
 Oaks d'Italia - (1) - Dionisia (2006)
 Premio Vittorio di Capua - (1) - Dick Turpin (2011)

 Japan
 Japan Cup - (1) - Epiphaneia (2014)
 Queen Elizabeth II Commemorative Cup - (1) - Lucky Lilac (2019)
 Tenno Sho (Autumn) - (1) -  Buena Vista (2010)

 United Arab Emirates
 Al Quoz Sprint - (1) - 	Shea Shea (2013)
 Dubai Duty Free Stakes - (1) - Terre à Terre (2002)
 Dubai Sheema Classic - (1) - Dolniya (2015)
 Jebel Hatta - (2) - Vercingetorix (2014), Dream Castle (2019)
 UAE Derby - (2) - Musir (2010), Mubtaahij (2015), Thunder Snow (2017)
 Dubai World Cup - (2) - Thunder Snow (2018, 2019)

 United States
 Breeders' Cup Turf - (1) - Shirocco (2005)

References

1981 births
Living people
People from Schaerbeek
French jockeys
Belgian expatriate sportspeople in France
Sportspeople from Brussels